Nonno Felice is an Italian sitcom. It has a spin-off, Norma e Felice.

Cast

Gino Bramieri: Nonno Felice / Miss Felicita
Paola Onofri: Ginevra
Franco Oppini: Franco Malinverni
Federico Rizzo: Federico Malinverni
Eva Prantera: Eva Malinverni
Morena Prantera: Morena Malinverni
Sonia Grey: Cassiera del bar

See also
List of Italian television series

External links
 

Italian television series
1992 Italian television series debuts
1995 Italian television series endings
Canale 5 original programming